Neoxus is a genus of spiny-legged rove beetles in the family Staphylinidae. There is one described species in Neoxus, N. crassicornis.

References

Further reading

 
 

Oxytelinae
Articles created by Qbugbot